= Condukiidae =

Scientific classification
- Domain: Eukaryota
- Kingdom: Animalia
- Phylum: Arthropoda
- Class: Malacostraca
- Order: Amphipoda
- Superfamily: Haustorioidea
- Family: Condukiidae; Barnard & Drummond, 1982

Family of crustaceans

Condukiidae is a family of crustaceans belonging to the order Amphipoda.

Genera:

- Condukius Barnard & Drummond, 1982
- Otagia Barnard & Karaman, 1991
